Tom Williamson (born 12 December 1998) is a former professional Australian rules footballer who played for the Carlton Football Club in the Australian Football League (AFL).

Hailing from Ararat, Williamson played TAC Cup football with North Ballarat until 2016.

Williamson quickly made his AFL debut, in round 3 of the 2017 season in the fifteen point victory against  at the Melbourne Cricket Ground. He recorded fifteen disposals and five tackles for the match. He managed 15 games in his debut season, and finished the season with stat averages of 12 disposals, 3 marks, 2 tackles and 1 spoil.

Williamson saw little football over the following two seasons, with back injuries limiting him to only two senior matches in 2018 and 2019. Nevertheless, he earned a two-year contract extension, signifying him as one of Carlton's long-term prospects. He made a return to regular senior football in 2020, playing 15 of Carlton's 17 games in the COVID-19 pandemic-shortened season, then played 11 of 22 games in 2021.

After playing only one game as an unused medical substitute in early 2022, Williamson took a leave of absence from the club in June due to undisclosed personal reasons, before retiring altogether one month later. Through his career, Williamson played primarily as a dashing and rebounding half-back and occasional wingman, noted for a long and accurate field kick.

After his departure from Carlton, Williamson signed a deal to play with North Melbourne's reserves for the rest of the 2022 season.

References

External links

 Tom Williamson's AFL Stats page on AFL.com.au

1998 births
Living people
Carlton Football Club players
Preston Football Club (VFA) players
Australian rules footballers from Victoria (Australia)
Greater Western Victoria Rebels players